Benjamin Frederick Mankiewicz (born March 25, 1967) is an American television personality, political commentator, and film critic. He is a host on Turner Classic Movies and has been a commentator on The Young Turks and What the Flick?!

Early life
Mankiewicz was born in Washington, D.C., to press secretary Frank Mankiewicz and Holly Mankiewicz (née Jolley) of German–Jewish descent. He is the cousin of screenwriter Tom Mankiewicz and filmmaker/television producer Nick Davis, the grandson of screenwriter Herman J. Mankiewicz, the grand-nephew of screenwriter, producer, and director Joseph L. Mankiewicz, and the brother of NBC News reporter Josh Mankiewicz.

He attended Georgetown Day School for his primary and secondary education, Tufts University for undergraduate studies, and Columbia University for graduate studies in journalism.

Career
Mankiewicz began his career as a reporter and an anchor for WCSC-TV (a CBS affiliate) in Charleston, South Carolina. He joined WAMI in Miami, Florida, in 1998, where he served as anchor of The Times, a daily news magazine show and the station's highlight program.

Since 2003, Mankiewicz has been a host of Turner Classic Movies. When he made his debut on TCM, he became the second host hired in the network's history (Robert Osborne being the first).  As a film critic, Mankiewicz co-hosted the nationally syndicated television series At the Movies from 2008 to 2009 and co-hosted the online film review show What the Flick?! on The Young Turks Network. He launched TCM original podcast (April 2020), "The Plot Thickens" in which he interviews renowned director Peter Bogdanovich (The Last Picture Show, Paper Moon, etc.) who chronicles his life in and out of film.  The podcast is scheduled to have others connected to film interviewed in subsequent podcasts.

Mankiewicz has made cameo appearances in the Lifetime television movie The Bling Ring (2011) and the action film White House Down (2013).  Mankiewicz also appears regularly on other shows as a political and media commentator, including The Michael Brooks Show in 2017, and hosts a segment on the CBS Sunday morning show called Screen Time. He was among the people interviewed for the documentary film Memory: The Origins of Alien (2019).

Filmography

Film

Television

References

External links
 
 

1967 births
20th-century American journalists
20th-century American male writers
21st-century American journalists
21st-century American male writers
American film critics
American male journalists
American male non-fiction writers
American people of German-Jewish descent
American podcasters
American radio personalities
American television hosts
California Democrats
Columbia University Graduate School of Journalism alumni
Georgetown Day School alumni
Journalists from Washington, D.C.
Living people
Mankiewicz family
The Young Turks people
Tufts University alumni